Matt Finlay (born September 28, 1962, in Toronto, Ontario) is a former professional Canadian football linebacker who played one season with the Montreal Alouettes and nine seasons for the Calgary Stampeders of the Canadian Football League.

External links
Bio

1962 births
Living people
Calgary Stampeders players
Canadian football linebackers
Eastern Michigan Eagles football players
Eastern Michigan University alumni
Montreal Alouettes players
Players of Canadian football from Ontario
Canadian football people from Toronto
Toronto Argonauts players